Prairie Lee Lake is a  freshwater reservoir located in Lee's Summit in Jackson County, Missouri. The lake is managed by Jackson County Parks and Recreation, and is located just south of the  Fleming Park.

Recreational Activities 
Activities at the lake including boating, canoeing, and fishing. Common fish include crappie, largemouth bass, and catfish.

Sources
 Prairie Lee Lake Lees Summit
 Prairie Lee Lake
 Physical, Chemical, and Biological Characteristics of Three Reservoirs in West-Central Missouri, 1991-93

Reservoirs in Missouri
Buildings and structures in Jackson County, Missouri
Protected areas of Jackson County, Missouri
Kansas City metropolitan area
Bodies of water of Jackson County, Missouri